Mohabat Ka Paigham is a 1989 Indian Bollywood film directed by Padmini Kapila. The film stars Shammi Kapoor, Raj Babbar, Aditya Pancholi, Meenakshi Sheshadri in pivotal roles. The music of the film was composed by Bappi Lahiri.

Cast
 Shammi Kapoor as Chaudhary Abdul Rehman
 Raj Babbar as Nadeem Rehman
 Aditya Pancholi as Naeem Rehman
 Meenakshi Sheshadri as Zeenat Banu
 Ranjeet as Raja
 Satyendra Kapoor as Dinu
 Shammi as Chand Bibi
 Yunus Parvez as Manzoor
 Pinchoo Kapoor as Usman

Soundtrack
Lyrics: Anjaan

External links

1980s Hindi-language films
1989 films
Films scored by Bappi Lahiri